Tomme Tønner is a Norwegian gangster comedy written and directed by Leon Bashir and Sebastian Dalén. The film premiered in Norway on 8 January 2010. The film got a sequel Tomme Tønner 2.

Synopsis 
The film follows three gangsters as they try to rise up the ranks, only to face setbacks and obstacles.

Cast 
 Leon Bashir – Ali
 Anders Danielsen Lie – Nico
 Jenny Skavlan – Yasmin
 Kim Bodnia – Dansken
 Kyrre Hellum – Fido
 Vegar Hoel – Tommy
 Kristoffer Joner – Finish
 Bjørn Sundquist – Arve
 Yasmine Garbi – Susie
 Slavko Labovic – Leo
 Bjørn Sundquist – Arve
 Stig Frode Henriksen – Tynn-Svein
 Tommy Wirkola – Gjørme-Knut
 Lene Alexandra Øien – police
 Geir Børresen – William
 Farakh Abbas – Bobby

Release 
Tomme Tønner  premiered in Norway on 8 January 2010. It performed well at the box office.

Reception 
The film was reviewed with a "die throw" of 5 in Rogalands Avis, 4 in Aftenposten, Dagsavisen, Dagbladet, Bergens Tidende, Bergensavisen and Klassekampen; 3 in VG, Stavanger Aftenblad and Fædrelandsvennen; and 2 in Adresseavisen. Dagens Næringsliv, which gave no "die throw," gave a mediocre review.

Leif Ove Larsen noted that the film was "Made in the style of Guy Ritchie's films from London's underworld" and that both it and the sequel "make fun of cultural stereotypes as well universal pretentiousness and stupidity, not the least by quoting from iconic comedies in the history of Norwegian national cinema."

References

External link 
 

2010 films
Norwegian crime comedy films
Gangster films